Swan Lake Township may refer to the following townships in the United States:

 Swan Lake Township, Emmet County, Iowa
 Swan Lake Township, Pocahontas County, Iowa
 Swan Lake Township, Stevens County, Minnesota